Natchaug State Forest is a Connecticut state forest located in six towns including Ashford, Chaplin, and Eastford.  The Natchaug River runs from north to south along (and in a few cases through) the western border of the main forest parcel. James L. Goodwin State Forest abuts Natchaug State Forest to the south.  One of the forest units abuts Mashamoquet Brook State Park in Pomfret.

Environment
The forest lies within the Northeastern coastal forests ecoregion.

Recreation opportunities
The forest's extensive trail system includes the Natchaug Trail and CCC Loop. Trails are used for hiking, horseback riding, mountain biking, cross-country skiing, and snowmobiling. Camping facilities are available for backpackers and equestrians.  The forest is also the site of a small state park encompassing the birthplace of American Civil War brigadier general Nathaniel Lyon.

See also

 Last Green Valley National Heritage Corridor

References

External links
Natchaug State Forest Connecticut Department of Energy and Environmental Protection

Connecticut state forests
Parks in Windham County, Connecticut
Ashford, Connecticut
Chaplin, Connecticut
Eastford, Connecticut
Protected areas established in 1917
1917 establishments in Connecticut